Bang or Ball is the fifth solo studio album by American rapper Mack 10. It was released on December 4, 2001, through Cash Money Records with distribution via Universal Records. Production was handled by Mannie Fresh, Dr. Dre, Ron and Quincy Jones III, with Ronald "Slim" Williams and Birdman serving as executive producers. It features guest appearances from Big Tymers, B.G., Mikkey, Butch Cassidy, E-40, Lac & Stone, Lil Wayne, Scarface, Skoop Delania, Turk, Xzibit, and Westside Connection. The album peaked at number 48 on the Billboard 200 and number 4 on the Top R&B/Hip-Hop Albums.

Track listing

Sample credits
Track 2 contains an interpolation of "Stayin' Alive" written by Barry Gibb, Maurice Gibb and Robin Gibb and performed by the Bee Gees

Charts

References

External links

2001 albums
Mack 10 albums
Cash Money Records albums
Albums produced by Dr. Dre
Albums produced by Mannie Fresh
Albums produced by Quincy Jones III